The WhatsOnStage Awards, founded in 2001 as the Theatregoers' Choice Awards, are a fan-driven set of awards organised by the theatre website WhatsOnStage.com, based on a popular vote recognising performers and productions of English theatre, with an emphasis on London's West End theatre.

The 2022 Whatsonstage Awards, the 22nd, took place on Sunday 27 February at the Prince of Wales Theatre. It was hosted for the third ceremony in a row by theatre star Jodie Prenger and Tom Read Wilson. Due to the COVID-19 pandemic and the resulting shut-down of UK theatres due to lockdowns, the 2021 edition of the show was cancelled and was replaced by an online event which celebrated twenty one members of the public who had supported the theatre industry during the pandemic, rather than the usual awarding of theatre productions themselves. The 2022 ceremony returns to awarding creative talent involved in West End theatre and is fully voted for by the British theatergoing public, who voted for their winners on WhatsOnStage.com.

The stage adaptation of Disney's blockbuster film Frozen received the most nominations with thirteen, equaling the record set by & Juliet at the 2020 ceremony, while The Tragedy of Macbeth was the most nominated play, with five nods. Due to the large volume of eligible productions, the number of nominations in each category was raised from five to six for the first time. The performance categories were changed to be gender-neutral in an effort to be more inclusive.

Winners and nominees
The nominees for the 22nd WhatsOnStage Awards were announced on 9 December 2021 by James Graham and Gabrielle Brooks in a livestream from The Other Palace.

{| class="wikitable" 
! Best New Play
! Best New Musical
|-
| valign="top" | 
 2:22 A Ghost Story
 J'ouvert
 Leopoldstadt
 Magic Goes Wrong
 Pride and Prejudice* (*sort of)
 The Ocean at the End of the Lane
| valign="top" | 
 Back to the Future: The Musical
 Cinderella
 Frozen
 Get Up, Stand Up! The Bob Marley Musical
 Pretty Woman: The Musical
 Moulin Rouge!
|-
! width="50%" |Best Play Revival
! width="50%" |Best Musical Revival
|-
| valign="top" |
 Cyrano de Bergerac
 Constellations
 My Night with Reg
 The Normal Heart
 The Tragedy of Macbeth
 Uncle Vanya
| valign="top" |
 Anything Goes
 Cabaret
 Carousel
 Rent
 South Pacific
 West Side Story
|-
! width="50%" |Best Performer in a Male Identifying Role in a Play
! width="50%" |Best Performer in a Female Identifying Role in a Play
|-
| valign="top" |
James McAvoy for Cyrano de Bergerac
 Richard Armitage for Uncle Vanya
 Ben Daniels for The Normal Heart
 Omari Douglas for Constellations
 Hadley Fraser for 2:22 A Ghost Story
 Henry Lewis for Magic Goes Wrong
| valign="top" |
Lily Allen for 2:22 A Ghost Story
 Gemma Arterton for Walden
 Sheila Atim for Constellations
 Emma Corrin for Anna X
 Patsy Ferran for Camp Siegfried
 Saoirse Ronan for The Tragedy of Macbeth
|-
! width="50%" |Best Performer in a Male Identifying Role in a Musical
! width="50%" |Best Performer in a Female Identifying Role in a Musical
|-
| valign="top" |
 Eddie Redmayne for Cabaret
 Roger Bart for Back to the Future: The Musical
 Olly Dobson for Back to the Future: The Musical
 Arinzé Kene for Get Up, Stand Up! The Bob Marley Musical
 Julian Ovenden for South Pacific
 Ivano Turco for Cinderella
| valign="top" |
 Carrie Hope Fletcher for Cinderella
 Aimie Atkinson for Pretty Woman: The Musical
 Samantha Barks for Frozen
 Jessie Buckley for Cabaret
 Beverley Knight for The Drifters Girl
 Stephanie McKeon for Frozen
|-
!Best Supporting Performer in a Male Identifying Role in a Play
!Best Supporting Performer in a Female Identifying Role in a Play
|-
| valign="top" |
 Jake Wood for 2:22 A Ghost Story
 Stephen K. Amos for My Night with Reg
 Dino Fetscher for The Normal Heart
 Nathaniel Parker for The Mirror and the Light
 Richard Rankin for The Tragedy of Macbeth
 Jonathan Sayer for Magic Goes Wrong
| valign="top" |
 Akiya Henry for The Tragedy of Macbeth
 Michelle Fox for Shining City
 Penny Layden for The Ocean at the End of the Lane
 Isobel McArthur for Pride and Prejudice* (*sort of)
 Nancy Zamit for Magic Goes Wrong
|-
!Best Supporting Performer in a Male Identifying Role in a Musical
!Best Supporting Performer in a Female Identifying Role in a Musical
|-
| valign="top" |
 Hugh Coles for Back to the Future: The Musical
 Blake Patrick Anderson for Be More Chill
 Robert Lindsay for Anything Goes
 Cedric Neal for Back to the Future: The Musical
 Oliver Ormson for Frozen
 Obioma Ugoala for Frozen
| valign="top" |
 Carly Mercedes Dyer for Anything Goes
 Joanna Ampil for South Pacific
 Gabrielle Brooks for Get Up, Stand Up! The Bob Marley Musical
 Victoria Hamilton-Barritt for Cinderella
 Millie O'Connell for Rent
 Rebecca Trehearn for Cinderella
|-
!Best Direction 
!Best Musical Direction
|-
| valign="top" |
 Michael Grandage for Frozen
 Clint Deyer for Get Up, Stand Up! The Bob Marley Musical
 Yaël Farber for The Tragedy of Macbeth
 Rebecca Frecknell for Cabaret
 Jamie Lloyd for Cyrano de Bergerac
 Katy Rudd for The Ocean at the End of the Lane
| valign="top" |
 Stephen Oremus for Frozen
 Leo Munby for The Last Five Years
 Tom Deering for Carousel
 Sean Green for Get Up, Stand Up! The Bob Marley Musical
 Justin Levine for Moulin Rouge!
 Katy Richardson for Rent
|-
!Best Choreography
!Best Sound Design
|-
| valign="top" |
 Rob Ashford for Frozen
 Drew McOnie for Carousel
 Kathleen Marshall for Anything Goes
 Shelley Maxwell for Get Up, Stand Up! The Bob Marley Musical
 Sonya Tayeh for Moulin Rouge!
 Ann Yee for South Pacific
| valign="top" |
 Gareth Owen for Back to the Future: The Musical Adam Cork for Leopoldstadt
 Adam Fisher for The Last Five Years
 Paul Groothuis for South Pacific
 Peter Hylenski for Moulin Rouge!
 Ben Ringham and Max Ringham for Cyrano de Bergerac
|-
!Best Set Design
!Best Costume Design
|-
| valign="top" |
 Christopher Oram for Frozen Fly Davis and Samuel Wyer for The Ocean at the End of the Lane Jamie Harrison for Bedknobs and Broomsticks Tim Hatley for Back to the Future: The Musical Derek McLane for Moulin Rouge! Tom Scutt for Cabaret| valign="top" |
 Christopher Oram for Frozen Lisa Duncan for Get Up, Stand Up! The Bob Marley Musical Tom Scutt for Cabaret Gabriella Slade for Bedknobs and Broomsticks Gabriela Tylesova for Cinderella Catherine Zuber for Moulin Rouge!|-
!Best Lighting Design
!Best Graphic Design
|-
| valign="top" |
 Tim Lutkin for Back to the Future: The Musical
 Neil Austin for Frozen Charles Balfour for Get Up, Stand Up! The Bob Marley Musical Isabella Byrd for Cabaret Bruno Poet for Cinderella Justin Townsend for Moulin Rouge!| valign="top" |
 Frozen (Bob King Creative)  Get Up, Stand Up! The Bob Marley Musical (Michael Nash Associates)
 RE:EMERGE Season (Muse Communication)
 Rent (Feast Creative)
 Romeo & Juliet (Feast Creative)
 The Wiz (Christopher D Clegg) 
|-
!Best Video Design
!
|-
| valign="top" |
 Finn Ross for Frozen Nina Dunn for The Shark is Broken Akhila Krishnan for What's New Pussycat? Mikaela Liakata and Tal Yarden for Anna X Finn Ross for Back to the Future: The Musical Tal Yarden for Get Up, Stand Up! The Bob Marley Musical|-
!Best Off-West End Production
!Best Regional Production
|-
| valign="top" |My Son's A Queer (But What Can You Do?) Anything is Possible if You Think About it Hard Enough Old Bridge Pippin Saving Britney The Last Five Years| valign="top" |Rent Bedknobs and Broomsticks Bloody Elle South Pacific West Side Story What's New Pussycat?|-
! colspan="2" |Best West End Show
|-
| colspan="2" valign="top" |
 Six Come from Away Hamilton Les Misérables The Play That Goes Wrong Wicked|}

Productions with multiple wins and nominations
 Multiple wins 
7 wins: Frozen4 wins: Back to the Future: The Musical3 wins: 2:22 A Ghost Story2 wins: Cyrano de Bergerac, Anything Goes Multiple nominations 
13 nominations: Frozen10 nominations: Get Up, Stand Up! The Bob Marley Musical9 nominations: Back to the Future: The Musical7 nominations: Cabaret, Cinderella, Moulin Rouge!6 nominations: Rent, South Pacific, The Tragedy of Macbeth5 nominations: Anything Goes, West Side Story4 nominations: 2:22 A Ghost Story, Magic Goes Wrong, Cyrano de Bergerac, The Ocean at the End of the Lane3 nominations: Bedknobs and Broomsticks, Carousel, Constellations, The Last Five Years, The Normal Heart2 nominations: Anna X, Leopoldstadt, My Night with Reg,Pretty Woman: The Musical,Pride and Prejudice* (*sort of), Uncle Vanya, What's New Pussycat?''

References

British theatre awards